Field hockey is one of ten core sports at the 2014 Commonwealth Games in Glasgow. It was the fifth appearance of hockey at the Commonwealth Games since its inclusion in 1998. The competition took place between Thursday 24 July and Sunday 3 August at the purpose built National Hockey Centre on the city's famous Glasgow Green.

Preparation
The purpose built National Hockey Centre hosted the 2014 Women's Hockey Champions Challenge I and a men's four nations tournament (involving Argentina, Belgium, England and Scotland) in April 2014 as test events in the lead up to the Commonwealth Games.

Men's tournament

Women's tournament

Medal table

Events

References

External links
Official results book – Hockey

 
2014
2014 Commonwealth Games events
Commonwealth Games
2014
Glasgow Green